William "W. J." Abrams (March 19, 1829September 12, 1900) was an American railroad surveyor, railroad businessman, and politician. He served as a member of the Wisconsin State Senate and the Assembly, and was the 21st and 23rd Mayor of Green Bay, Wisconsin.

Early life
Abrams was born in Cambridge, New York, the son of Isaac T. Abrams and Ruth (Hall) Abrams. He attended school in Cambridge and Troy, New York before studying theology in Williamstown, Massachusetts. He was not able to finish his studies due to poor health.

Career
Abrams completed railroad surveys from Lake Michigan to Ontonogan, Michigan before moving to Wisconsin in 1856, and settling in Green Bay in 1861. He was involved in water transportation facilities before becoming a railroad businessman. He was a promoter for the Green Bay and Lake Pepin Railroad, which would become the Green Bay and Western Railroad. Abrams served as Chairman of the Board and President for the railroad.

Abrams was a Democratic member of the State Assembly from 1864 to 1867  and the State Senate from 1868 to 1869. He was later Mayor of Green Bay in 1881 and again from 1883 to 1884. He served as Vice-President of the Soldiers Orphans Home in Madison, Wisconsin.

In 1881, Abrams owned land where the Chicago, Milwaukee, and St. Paul Railroad built a depot in the area that was to become Abrams, Wisconsin. The town of Abrams was named in his honor.

Abrams died on September 12, 1900 in Wisconsin and is interred at Woodlawn Cemetery.

Personal life
In 1854, Abrams married Henrietta T. Alton. They had three children, Kate, Ruth and Winford. Their son Winford also served as Mayor of Green Bay.

References

People from Cambridge, New York
Mayors of Green Bay, Wisconsin
Democratic Party Wisconsin state senators
19th-century American railroad executives
American railroad executives
American railway entrepreneurs
1829 births
1900 deaths
19th-century American politicians
Democratic Party members of the Wisconsin State Assembly